This article contains information about the literary events and publications of 1685.

Events
January 22 – Antoine Furetière is expelled from the Académie française for proposing to publish a complete dictionary of the French language himself.
February – The death of King Charles II of England brings a major theatrical flop in the Restoration era: Albion and Albanius – an allegorical drama in praise of the king with a text by John Dryden and music by Louis Grabu – is in rehearsal at the time.
June – A revised version of Albion and Albanius fails largely because it coincides with the invasion of the Duke of Monmouth.
June – Parliament revives the Printing Act of 1662, limiting London printers.
unknown date – The Fourth Folio of Shakespeare's works is published in London.

New books

Prose
Scipion Abeille – Histoire des Os ("Description of the Bones")
Aphra Behn – Love-Letters Between a Nobleman and His Sister
Ihara Saikaku – Five Women Who Loved Love
John Spencer – De Legibus Hebraeorum, Ritualibus et earum Rationibus libri tres

Drama
Jean Galbert de Campistron – Andronic
John Crowne – Sir Courtly Nice
Thomas d'Urfey
The Banditti, or A Lady's Distress
A Commonwealth of Women (adapted from The Sea Voyage)
Nahum Tate
The Cuckold's Haven (adaptation of Eastward Ho)
A Duke and No Duke (adaptation of Sir Aston Cockayne's Trappolin Suppos'd a Prince)

Births
January 9 – Tiberius Hemsterhuis, Dutch critic (died 1766)
March 12 – George Berkeley Irish philosopher and bishop (died 1753)
June 30 – John Gay, English poet and dramatist (died 1732)

Deaths
March 18 – Francis Harold, Irish Franciscan historian (year of birth not known)
c. April 14 – Thomas Otway, English dramatist (born 1652)
April 29 – Luc d'Achery, French author of critical editions of medieval manuscripts (born 1609)
June 16 – Anne Killigrew, English poet and painter (born 1660)
June 17 – Andrew Allam, English historian (born 1655)
July 1 – Nalan Xingde, Chinese ci poet (born 1655)
September 25 – Jean Cabassut, French theologian (born 1604)
October 23 – Yamaga Sokō (山鹿 素行), Japanese philosopher (born 1622)
unknown date – Placido Puccinelli, Italian historian (born 1609)

References

 
Years of the 17th century in literature